Walter Wilbert Westall (October 9, 1880 in Cornwall, Orange County, New York – June 4, 1968) was an American lawyer and politician from New York.

Life
He was the son of John Wendt Westall Jr. He attended Cornwall High School. He graduated from Syracuse University School of Law, and began the practice of law in Syracuse. Later he removed to White Plains, and practiced law in Westchester County and New York City.  He married Marion Edna (died 1966), and they had one daughter.
 
Westall was a member of the New York State Assembly (Westchester Co., 2nd D.) in 1919, 1920, 1921 and 1922.

He was a member of the New York State Senate (25th D.) from 1923 to 1934, sitting in the 146th, 147th, 148th, 149th, 150th, 151st, 152nd, 153rd, 154th, 155th, 156th and 157th New York State Legislature.

He was Secretary of the Westchester County Republican Committee from 1945 until his death in 1968.

Sources
 History of the Valley of the Hudson (Vol. 5; 1931; pg. 354)
 MRS. WALTER WESTALL in NYT on May 26, 1966 (subscription required)
 WALTER W. WESTALL, REPUBLICAN LEADER in NYT on June 6, 1968 (subscription required)

1880 births
1968 deaths
Republican Party New York (state) state senators
People from White Plains, New York
Republican Party members of the New York State Assembly
Syracuse University College of Law alumni
People from Cornwall, New York
20th-century American politicians